Søren Andersen (born 1970) is a Danish footballer who participated in the 1996 European Championship.

Søren Andersen may also refer to:

 Søren Andersen (footballer, born 1925) (1925–1998), Danish footballer
 Søren Andersen (footballer, born 1937) (1937–1960), Danish footballer who was the top goalscorer of the 1957 Danish football championship
 Søren Andersen (handballer) (born 1948), Danish handballer who competed at the 1976 Summer Olympics
 Søren Norby (died 1530), full name Søren Andersen Norby, a Danish 16th century grand admiral
 Søren Andersen, Norwegian sailor who first spotted Veier Head
 Søren Kragh Andersen (born 1994), Danish cyclist